Sara Collins is a Jamaican-born Caymanian-British novelist and former lawyer. She earned a Costa Book Award for her 2019 historical fiction novel The Confessions of Frannie Langton.

Early life and law
Collins was born in Kingston, Jamaica. Her family fled to Grand Cayman in the Cayman Islands, the home of her paternal grandmother, when she was four in light of political violence following the 1976 Jamaican election. She attended boarding school in England at the age of 11.

Collins went on to graduate in law from the London School of Economics. She worked for 17 years as a lawyer, during which time she jointly edited International Trust Disputes. She was a partner and Head of Trust & Private Client in the Cayman Islands office of Conyers Dill & Pearman.

Writing
Collins took a Master of Studies degree in creative writing at the Institute of Continuing Education, University of Cambridge in 2014-2016. While studying at Cambridge she was awarded the 2016 Michael Holroyd prize for non-fiction (or, as he termed it, "recreative writing") for her work Knocking on Walcott's Door, described as "a form of literary autobiography".

The Confessions of Frannie Langton takes the form of the deposition of a woman charged with murder, written for her trial at the Old Bailey in London in 1826. Frannie Langton had grown up as a slave on a Jamaican sugar plantation, where her slave-owner had employed her in his research "desperate to prove that Africans aren't human". She was given to George Benham and his French wife in London, and "Then, in unclear circumstances, the Benhams are murdered". The book was published in 2019 by Viking, who acquired it shortly before nine companies were due to bid for its rights. Reviewing the book in The Guardian, Natasha Pulley praised it and said "Between her historical research, Frannie's voice and a plot that never slows to a walk, the novel pulls the gothic into new territory and links it back to its origins."  The reviewer in The Irish Times calls the novel "a beguiling story with strong feminist overtones". Collins won the First Novel award in the 2019 Costa Book Awards.

Collins was shortlisted for the 2020 McKitterick Prize, awarded by the Society of Authors to a debut novelist over the age of 40.

In 2020, ITV announced that they had commissioned Collins to adapt The Confessions of Frannie Langton for television with Drama Republic; filming is expected to take place in London in 2021.

Personal life
Collins splits her time between London and Cayman. She married Scottish lawyer Iain McMurdo in 2008. They were both single parents when they met at their law firm, McMurdo a widower with three daughters and Collins a divorcee with two.

Selected publications

References

External links

  Interview

Year of birth missing (living people)
Living people
21st-century British novelists
Alumni of the London School of Economics
Alumni of the University of Cambridge
British women novelists
Caymanian expatriates in England
Costa Book Award winners
Jamaican emigrants to the Cayman Islands
People from Kingston, Jamaica